Fahrettin Cansever (1 January 1930 – 1 June 1987) was a Turkish international association football player and manager.

Career

International career
On 20 November 1949, Turkey played the qualifying encounter against Syria where their beat their opponents by 7–0 final score, including a hat-trick of Fahrettin Cansever, and qualified for 1950 FIFA World Cup, under management of Cihat Arman.

Honours
 Beşiktaş J.K.
 Istanbul Football League (3): 1949–50, 1950–51, 1953–54

References
Citations

External links
 Fahrettin Cansever at TFF

1930 births
1987 deaths
Association football midfielders
Turkish footballers
Turkey international footballers
Süper Lig players
Beşiktaş J.K. footballers
MKE Ankaragücü footballers
Turkish football managers
Fatih Karagümrük S.K. managers
Konyaspor managers